The UR-100 was an intercontinental ballistic missile (ICBM) developed and deployed by the Soviet Union from 1966 to 1996. UR in its designation stood for Universal Rocket. It was known during the Cold War by the NATO reporting name SS-11 Sego and internally by the GRAU index 8K84. The Strela and Rokot carrier rockets are based on it.

The similar designation UR-100MR actually refers to an entirely different missile, the MR-UR-100 Sotka (SS-17 Spanker).

Description 
The UR-100 was a two-stage liquid-propellant lightweight ICBM. Initial versions carried a single warhead of 0.5 to 1.1 Mt yield, while later versions could carry three or six MIRV warheads. The missile was silo-launched. 15P784 silo design (by KBOM, Design Bureau of Common Machinery, of V.P.Barmin) was greatly simplified in comparison to earlier missiles. Facilities consisted of hardened, un-manned silos controlled by a single central command post. This was the first soviet ICBM (8K84M, entered service on 3 October 1971) equipped with missile defense countermeasure "Palma" by NII-108 of V.Gerasimenko.

Variants and developments 
 UR-100 with 8K84 missile — original development
 UR-100 with 8K84M missile — improved variant
 UR-100N with 15A30 missile — enlarged UR-100. This variant is the basis of the Rokot space launch system.
 UR-100N UTTH with 15A35 missile — improved UR-100N (The "UTTH" (or "UTTKh") abbreviated suffix is often used in missile names. This means literally "improved tactical and technical characteristics", Russian: УТТХ = улучшенные тактико-технические характеристики)
 UR-100MR 15P015 with 15A15 missile — a different missile to replace the original UR-100

Operational history 
  The UR-100 reached initial operational capability with the Strategic Rocket Forces in 1966, and by 1972, 990 launchers had been deployed. An additional 420 launchers of newer version missiles were added by 1976. The missile was deployed as a counterpart to the United States' LGM-30 Minuteman, and relied on numbers for effectiveness. Original versions were phased out during the 1970s, but 326 of the newer missiles (8K84M, UR-100N, UR-100NUTTH) remained in service by 1991. These were phased out completely by 1996. Strategic Rocket Forces was the only operator of the UR-100.
Formations included:
 4th Rocket Division (Drovyanaya, Chita Oblast) (53rd Rocket Army)

As a space launcher
The Strela and Rokot carrier rockets are based on the UR-100.

See also 
 List of missiles
 List of rockets

External links 

 8K84 

Cold War intercontinental ballistic missiles of the Soviet Union
Universal Rocket (rocket family)
Intercontinental ballistic missiles of the Soviet Union
NPO Mashinostroyeniya products
Military equipment introduced in the 1960s